The men's freestyle 74 kg is a competition featured at the 2016 European Wrestling Championships, and was held in Riga, Latvia on March 10.

Medalists

Results
Legend
R — Retired
F — Won by fall

Final

Top half

Section 1

Section 3

Repechage

References
Official website

Men's freestyle 74 kg